Myb-binding protein 1A is a protein that in humans is encoded by the MYBBP1A gene.

References

Further reading